Áron Reisz (born Mart 7, 1995) is a Hungarian professional ice hockey Forward who currently plays for Fehérvár AV19 in the Austrian Hockey League (EBEL).

References

External links

1995 births
Fehérvár AV19 players
Living people
Hungarian ice hockey centres
Sportspeople from Miercurea Ciuc